The 2001 Major League Baseball season finished with the Arizona Diamondbacks defeating the New York Yankees in seven games for the World Series championship. The September 11 terrorist attacks on New York and Washington, D.C. pushed the end of the regular season from September 30 to October 7. Because of the attacks, the World Series was not completed until November 4. The 2001 World Series was the first World Series to end in November.

MLB used an unbalanced schedule for the first time since 1992 in the National League and 1976 in the American League. In all divisions except the NL Central and AL West each team played each of the other four teams in the same division 19 times. In the NL Central division foes met 16 or 17 times per season and in the AL West there were 19 or 20 games between each division foe. 

This season was memorable for the Seattle Mariners tying the Major League regular season record of 116 wins, Barry Bonds breaking Mark McGwire's single-season home run record, and baseball's patriotic return after a week's worth of games being postponed due to the 9/11 terrorist attacks.

Standings

American League

National League

Postseason

Bracket

Note: Two teams in the same division could not meet in the division series.

MLB statistical leaders

Managers

American League

National League

±hosted the MLB All Star Game

Awards

Other awards
Outstanding Designated Hitter Award: Edgar Martínez (SEA)
Hank Aaron Award: Alex Rodriguez (TEX, American); Barry Bonds (SF, National).
Roberto Clemente Award (Humanitarian): Curt Schilling (ARI).
Rolaids Relief Man Award: Mariano Rivera (NYY, American); Armando Benítez (NYM, National).
Warren Spahn Award (Best left-handed pitcher): Randy Johnson (ARI)

Player of the Month

Pitcher of the Month

Rookie of the Month

Home Field Attendance & Payroll

See also
2001 Nippon Professional Baseball season

References

External links
 2001 Major League Baseball season schedule at Baseball Reference
 Major League Baseball standings 2001

 
Major League Baseball seasons